John Forrest Finds Himself is a 1920 British silent romance film directed by Henry Edwards and starring Edwards, Chrissie White and Gerald Ames.

Cast
 Henry Edwards - John Forrest 
 Chrissie White - Joan Grey 
 Gerald Ames - Ezra Blott 
 Hugh Clifton - O'Reilly 
 Gwynne Herbert - Mrs. Forrest 
 Henry Vibart - Mr. Forrest 
 Mary Brough - Biddy 
 Eileen Dennes - The Pet 
 John MacAndrews - Carter Joe 
 Victor Prout - Stephen Grey 
 John Deverell - Hon, Vere Blair 
 Marion Dyer - Sylvia Grey

References

External links

1920 films
British silent feature films
1920s romance films
Films directed by Henry Edwards
Hepworth Pictures films
British black-and-white films
British romance films
1920s English-language films
1920s British films
English-language romance films